SSV Reutlingen 05 is a German association football club from Reutlingen, Baden-Württemberg.

History
The club was founded as FC Arminia Reutlingen and was renamed SV Reutlingen 1905 in 1910. The club fused with 1. Schwimmverein 1911 to form the current side in 1938.

Reutlingen became a decent regional side in the years after World War II, two second-place finishes in the Oberliga (I) in 1950 and 1955 being the highlight, and earned a place in the second tier Regionalliga Süd in 1963 when Germany's new top flight professional league, the Bundesliga, was formed. After a second-place finish in their division in 1965, SSV took part in the Bundesliga promotion rounds, where they faced Bayern Munich and Borussia Mönchengladbach for the right to make their Bundesliga début. Reutlingen were held to a 1–1 draw against Mönchengladbach on their home ground, but were crushed 7–0 away, and finished a point behind them in their group.

Reutlingen continued to play second division football until the early 1970s when they dropped into the Amateur Oberliga Baden-Württemberg (III), briefly even falling to fourth-tier Verbandsliga Württemberg. They spent most of the next two-and-a-half decades at the third level before playing their way back to the second tier on the strength of a first-place finish in their division that began with a sixteen-game winning streak to open the season. Their three-year adventure in the 2. Bundesliga ended in 2003 after the team was penalised six points for financial irregularities the previous year. They were then denied a licence to play in the third division Regionalliga Süd and were forced down to Oberliga Baden-Württemberg (IV).

The team finished in first place in the Oberliga Baden-Württemberg in 2005–06 and returned to the Regionalliga Süd (III) for the 2006–07 season. SSV remained in the third division for two years, narrowly missing promotion into the newly formed 3. Liga at the end of the 2007–08 campaign. Without a place in this new national league, the Nullfünfer remained in the Regionalliga Süd, now as a fourth-tier side.

The 2008–09 and 2009–10 seasons saw SSV finish in the middle of the Regionalliga Süd table with early exits from the WFV-Pokal in both campaigns. After finishing in 14th position in the Regionalliga Süd in the 2009–10 season, the team was denied a licence to continue playing in the fourth division due to financial insolvency. SSV have competed in the fifth-tier Oberliga Baden-Württemberg since the 2010–11 season.

The club won the 2014–15 edition of the Württemberg Cup, defeating FV Ravensburg in the final, and thereby qualified for the first round of the 2015–16 DFB-Pokal. Here they beat their local rivals Karlsruher SC 3–1 at the Kreuzeiche with three penalties from their captain, Giuseppe Ricciardi. In the second round, SSV lost 4–0 against another team from the 2. Bundesliga, Eintracht Braunschweig.

Current squad

Honours
The club's honours:

League
 German amateur football championship
 Champions: (2) 1974, 1997
 Oberliga Südwest (I)
 Runners-up: 1950
 Oberliga Süd (I)
 Runners-up: 1955
 2nd Oberliga Süd (II)
 Runners-up: (2) 1954, 1957
 Regionalliga Süd (II) ‡
 Runners-up: 1965
 Regionalliga Süd (III) ‡
 Champions: 2000
 Oberliga Baden-Württemberg (III-IV)
 Champions: (3) 1989, 1992, 2006
 Verbandsliga Württemberg (IV)
 Champions: 1985
 Amateurliga Schwarzwald-Bodensee (III)
 Champions: (3) 1975, 1977, 1978

Cup
 Württemberg Cup
 Winners: (4) 1988, 1990, 1999, 2015
 Runners-up: (3) 1969, 1991, 1995

 ‡ There has been two separate incarnations of the Regionalliga Süd, one existing from 1963 to 1974 and the other from 1994 to 2012.

Recent managers
Recent managers of the club:

Recent seasons
The recent season-by-season performance of the club:

 With the introduction of the Regionalligas in 1994 and the 3. Liga in 2008 as the new third tier, below the 2. Bundesliga, all leagues below dropped one tier.

References

External links
 Official team site
 The Abseits Guide to German Soccer
 SSV Reutlingen at Weltfussball.de
 Das deutsche Fußball-Archiv historical German domestic league tables 

 
Football clubs in Germany
Football clubs in Baden-Württemberg
Reutlingen
Association football clubs established in 1905
1905 establishments in Germany
2. Bundesliga clubs
Sport in Tübingen (region)